The following is a list of pipeline accidents in the United States in 1973. It is one of several lists of U.S. pipeline accidents. See also: list of natural gas and oil production accidents in the United States.

Incidents 

This is not a complete list of all pipeline accidents. For natural gas alone, the Pipeline and Hazardous Materials Safety Administration (PHMSA), a United States Department of Transportation agency, has collected data on more than 3,200 accidents deemed serious or significant since 1987.

A "significant incident" results in any of the following consequences:
 Fatality or injury requiring in-patient hospitalization.
 $50,000 or more in total costs, measured in 1984 dollars.
 Liquid releases of five or more barrels (42 US gal/barrel).
 Releases resulting in an unintentional fire or explosion.

PHMSA and the National Transportation Safety Board (NTSB) post-incident data and results of investigations into accidents involving pipelines that carry a variety of products, including natural gas, oil, diesel fuel, gasoline, kerosene, jet fuel, carbon dioxide, and other substances. Occasionally pipelines are re-purposed to carry different products.

The following incidents occurred during 1973:
 1973 On January 10, an abandoned farm near Bellingham, Washington was coated in crude oil, when a Trans-Mountain 16-inch pipeline failed. Over 300,000 gallons of crude were recovered.
 1973 On February 2, leaking natural gas led to an explosion and fire, that leveled two buildings, and damaged a third building, in Eagle Grove, Iowa. 12 people died. 
 1973 A cracked gas main leaked in Adamsville, Alabama, on February 7. The escaping gas exploded, killing three people and injuring two others. A string of other gas main cracking incidents occurred in this city, killing one other person, and injuring two more.
 1973 Installation of a sewer was suspected of damaging a gas line, in Coopersburg, Pennsylvania, on February 21. Leaking gas later exploded in an apartment building, killing five people, injuring 22 others, and destroying the building.
 1973 On February 22, in Austin, Texas, a 19-inch natural gas liquids (NGL) pipeline ruptured, due to an improper weld. A passing truck appeared to set off a vapor cloud explosion and fire. Six people were killed, and two others injured.
 1973 On March 20, a butane pipeline burst in Portland, Texas, causing 50 families to evacuate. There was no fire or injuries.
 1973 On May 2, a Yellowstone Pipeline 10-inch line ruptured, in Murray, Idaho, causing a mist of diesel fuel to cover homes and trailers. About 170,000 gallons of fuel were spilled. Some of the fuel reached a nearby creek. There was no fire.
 1973 Improper sampling procedures on an LPG pipeline killed one worker, and injured another, from freezing at Dayton, Ohio, on May 3.
 1973 On June 2, an Exxon 12-inch crude oil pipeline started leaking at the Atchafalaya River near Melville, Louisiana.
 1973 In the summer, a pipeline ruptured in Diamond, Louisiana. The escaping gas fumes were ignited by a lawnmower, killing two people.
A failed gasket caused the spill.
 1973 On July 4, a gas main explosion set off an apartment house fire in Long Beach, California, burning two persons. Two others who jumped from windows also were injured. The explosion, which occurred after 8:30 p.m., ripped a 40-foot hole in the street and sent flames into the fifteen-unit structure.
 1973 On August 29, an 8-inch gas pipeline failed in Memphis, Tennessee, forcing over 100 people to evacuate the area. There was no fire.
 1973 A crude oil pipeline ruptured in Los Angeles, California on October 18. Crude flowed along several streets for a time.
 1973 On November 13, a Buckeye Partners pipeline leaked, spilling gasoline into a Marion Township, Berks County, Pennsylvania creek.
 1973 On December 4, a pipeline break released  of oil near Argyle, Minnesota. The cause was a failure in a longitudinal weld.
 1973 On December 6, a pump station on an ammonia pipeline near Conway, Kansas, was started against a closed valve, and the pipeline failed in a previously damaged section.

References

Lists of pipeline accidents in the United States
pipeline accidents
1973 in the environment
1973 in the United States